Crenicichla proteus is a species of cichlid native to South America. It is found in the Amazon river basin, in the Napo and Putumayo drainages in Ecuador, in the Ucayali-Amazon drainage from Chicosa to Pebas in Peru, and upper Purus basin.

References

Kullander, S.O., 1986. Cichlid fishes of the Amazon River drainage of Peru. Department of Vertebrate Zoology, Research Division, Swedish Museum of Natural History, Stockholm, Sweden, 394 p. 

proteus
Fish of Ecuador
Freshwater fish of Peru
Fish of the Amazon basin
Taxa named by Edward Drinker Cope
Fish described in 1872